Ooni Agbedegbede was the 23rd Ooni of Ife, a paramount traditional ruler of Ile Ife, the ancestral home of the Yorubas. He succeeded Ooni Lumobi and was succeeded by  
Ooni Ojelokunbirin.

References

Oonis of Ife
Yoruba history